Deng Jie (born October 21, 1958) is a Chinese actress and producer. Deng was born in Chengdu and attended the Qiujing High School in Chongqing. In 1973, she trained at the Sichuan Opera School.

She portrayed Wang Xifeng in TV series Dream of the Red Chamber and became well known in mainland China. Her husband is Zhang Guoli, a noted Chinese actor and director.

Filmography

Film

Television

References

External links

Actresses from Chengdu
1958 births
Living people
Chinese film actresses
Chinese television actresses
20th-century Chinese actresses
21st-century Chinese actresses
20th-century Chinese women singers
Participants in Chinese reality television series
Sichuan opera actresses
Singers from Chengdu